The Idomoid languages are spoken primarily in Benue State of east-central Nigeria and surrounding regions. Idoma itself is an official language spoken by nearly four million people including the subgroups of Igede, Uffia, Otukpo, and Orokam.

Languages

Yace (Akpa)
Etulo–Idoma
Etulo
Idoma: Idoma, Igede, Agatu, Alago, Yala

Ethnologue includes Eloyi, though that assignment is outdated as Blench (2007) considers Eloyi to be a divergent Plateau language that has undergone Idomoid influence, rather than vice versa.

Ethnologue also calls the non-Yace branch "Akweya", despite the fact that Yace are also called "Akweya".

Names and locations
Below is a list of language names, populations, and locations from Blench (2019).

See also
List of Proto-Idomoid reconstructions (Wiktionary)

References

 
Volta–Niger languages